The International Phonetic Alphabet distinguishes two near-close near-back vowels:

 The near-close near-back rounded vowel 

International Phonetic Alphabet
Vowels